The 1998 Madrid motorcycle Grand Prix was the sixth round of the 1998 Grand Prix motorcycle racing season. It took place on 14 June 1998 at the Circuito Permanente del Jarama. It was held to replace the Portuguese Grand Prix due to homologation issues of the Autódromo do Estoril.

500 cc classification

250 cc classification

125 cc classification

Championship standings after the race (500cc)

Below are the standings for the top five riders and constructors after round six has concluded. 

Riders' Championship standings

Constructors' Championship standings

 Note: Only the top five positions are included for both sets of standings.

References

Madrid motorcycle Grand Prix
Madrid
Madrid Grand Prix
1990s in Madrid